Singapore is a global city and sovereign state in Southeast Asia and the world's only island city-state. Singapore has a highly developed market economy, based historically on extended entrepôt trade. Along with Hong Kong, South Korea, and Taiwan, Singapore is one of the original Four Asian Tigers, but has surpassed its peers in terms of GDP per capita. Between 1965 and 1995, growth rates averaged around 6 per cent per annum, transforming the living standards of the population. The Singaporean economy is known as one of the freest, most innovative, most competitive, most dynamic and most business-friendly. The 2015 Index of Economic Freedom ranks Singapore as the second-freest economy in the world and the Ease of Doing Business Index has also ranked Singapore as the easiest place to do business for the past decade. According to the Corruption Perceptions Index, Singapore is consistently ranked as one of the least corrupt countries in the world, along with New Zealand and the Scandinavian countries.

To start a business in Singapore, business owners have to register with the Accounting and Corporate Regulatory Authority (ACRA). ACRA is the national regulator and company registrar of business entities, accountants and service providers in Singapore.

Largest firms

Largest public companies
This list shows firms in the Forbes Global 2000, which ranks the world's largest public companies for 2022. Only the top five firms (if available) are included as a sample.

By total revenue
This list shows firms in the Fortune Global 500, which ranks firms by total revenue for 2022. Only the top five firms (if available) are included as a sample.

Notable firms 
This list includes notable companies with primary headquarters located in the country. The industry and sector follow the Industry Classification Benchmark taxonomy. Organizations which have ceased operations are included and noted as defunct.

See also 
 Economy of Singapore
 List of largest companies in Singapore
 List of companies listed on the Singapore Exchange
 Straits Times Index

References 

Singapore